The Next Big Thing: NY is an American reality television series on Oxygen. The series debuted on June 12, 2012, and follows performance coaches that mentoring a group of entertainers seeking their breakthrough in show business.

Episodes

References

External links

2010s American reality television series
2012 American television series debuts
2012 American television series endings
English-language television shows
Oxygen (TV channel) original programming